NA-38 Karak is a constituency for the National Assembly of Pakistan. It covers whole of district Karak. The constituency was formerly known as NA-15 Karak from 1977 to 2018. The name changed to NA-34 Karak after the delimitation in 2018 and to NA-38 Karak after the delimitation in 2022.

Members of Parliament

1977–2002: NA-15 Karak

2002–2018: NA-15 Karak

2018-2022: NA-34 Karak

Elections since 2002

2002 general election

A total of 1,780 votes were rejected.

2008 general election

A total of 2,636 votes were rejected.

2013 general election

A total of 4,284 votes were rejected.

2018 general election 

General elections were held on 25 July 2018.

By-election 2023 
A by-election will be held on 19 March 2023 due to the resignation of Shahid Ahmad, the previous MNA from this seat.

See also
NA-37 Kurram
NA-39 Bannu

References

External links 
 Election result's official website

34
34